Group A of the 2010 Fed Cup Europe/Africa Zone Group III was one of two pools in the Europe/Africa Zone Group III of the 2010 Fed Cup. Three teams competed in a round robin competition, with the top two teams and the bottom team proceeding to their respective sections of the play-offs: the top teams played for advancement to the Group II.

Turkey vs. Egypt

Turkey vs. Moldova

Egypt vs. Moldova

See also
Fed Cup structure

References

External links
 Fed Cup website

2010 Fed Cup Europe/Africa Zone